Chicken Salad Chick is a fast casual restaurant chain and franchise of chicken salad restaurants based in Auburn, Alabama. To date, the chain consists of over 280 franchise restaurants and stores in 19 different U.S. states.

History
The company started with Stacy Brown and her husband, Kevin, who died in 2015 from colon cancer. Stacy Brown, who was unemployed, divorced, and raising three children, started selling her homemade chicken salad door-to-door in Auburn, Alabama. With the health department prohibiting the sale of foods cooked in one's home, the Browns devised a plan to open a restaurant.

In 2016, Chicken Salad Chick was ranked #37 on the Inc. 5000 list of fastest-growing companies in the U.S.

The restaurant is partially owned by private equity firm Brentwood Associates, who also have investments in Blaze Pizza and Lazy Dog Restaurant & Bar.

Fare

The restaurant serves fifteen styles of chicken salad, served on bread, lettuce as a scoop with crackers, or in a leafy green salad. It also provides chicken salad by the pound for take-out and delicatessen-style sandwiches and side dishes.

The restaurant's menu includes pimento cheese, egg salad, broccoli salad, fruit salad, macaroni and cheese, pasta salad, and grape salad. Daily soup specials include tomato bisque, broccoli & cheese, chicken & artichoke florentine, and chicken tortilla; loaded potato soup is available daily.

Philanthropy
The Chicken Salad Chick Foundation was founded by the company in August 2014 and is a partner with the American Cancer Society. The foundation also partners with food banks in communities with Chicken Salad Chick restaurant locations in efforts to nourish people in need. For example, in 2014, the foundation donated over $6,000 to the Chattanooga Area Food Bank. Since the foundation's inception, Chicken Salad Chick restaurants have served to generate "...more than $100,000 in donations to fight cancer and hunger in the communities it serves". Barclay Smith is the director of the foundation.

See also

 List of chicken restaurants
 List of casual dining restaurant chains

References

Further reading

External links
 

Poultry restaurants
 Companies based in Auburn, Alabama
 Restaurants established in 2008
 American companies established in 2008
2008 establishments in Alabama
Chicken chains of the United States